Mottahedeh is a surname. Notable people with the surname include:

 Mildred Mottahedeh (1908 – 2000), American businesswoman and porcelain collector
 Roy Mottahedeh (born 1940), American historian
 Iraj Mottahedeh (born 1942), retired Anglican bishop
 Negar Mottahedeh, cultural critic and film theorist